Greatest Britons was a one-off awards show on ITV, celebrating the best of British talent. It is distinct from 100 Greatest Britons.

Greatest Britons recognises the most creative and successful people from across the UK who've achieved worldwide fame within their professional fields. The winners of most of the awards are decided by an expert panel of judges. The award of Greatest Living Briton is voted for by the public.

The awards aired on Monday 21 May 2007, with Kate Thornton as host, and they were produced by Shine Limited in association with The Sun and Marks & Spencer.

Panelists
Duncan Bannatyne
Andrea Catherwood
Lord Coe
Richard Curtis
Zac Goldsmith
Colin Jackson
Kelly Hoppen
James King
Trevor Nelson
Kelly Osbourne
Zandra Rhodes
Stuart Rose
June Sarpong

2007 Awards
Greatest Living Briton
Winner: HM The Queen
Nominees: Dame Julie Andrews; Sir Paul McCartney; Baroness Margaret Thatcher; Robbie Williams
The Arts
Winner: Banksy
Nominees: Antony Gormley; Sam Mendes
Business
Winner: innocent Drinks
Nominees: Simon Fuller; Gordon Ramsay
Campaigner
Winner: Duncan Goose
Nominees: Kierra Box; Shami Chakrabarti
Fashion
Winner: Giles Deacon
Nominees: Christopher Bailey; Stella McCartney
Film
Winner: Dame Helen Mirren
Nominees: Sacha Baron Cohen; Daniel Craig
Import
Winner: David Beckham
Music
Winner: Amy Winehouse
Nominees: Sir Elton John; Take That
Sport
Winner: Sir Ranulph Fiennes
Nominees: Joe Calzaghe; Lewis Hamilton
Television
Winner: Ricky Gervais
Nominees: Simon Cowell; Ashley Jensen

2007 television specials
ITV (TV network) original programming
British television awards